The Darkside Vol. 1 is the tenth studio album by American rapper Fat Joe. The album was released July 27, 2010 by Terror Squad Entertainment and E1 Music. The album's production was handled by Cool & Dre, Streetrunner, DJ Infamous, Just Blaze, Scram Jones, DJ Premier, Raw Uncut, and Scoop DeVille, among others. The album also featured guest appearances came from Trey Songz, Too Short, R. Kelly, Cam'ron, Clipse, Lil Wayne and Young Jeezy.

Background
The album was announced in January 2010 by Fat Joe saying that "he was working on a new album, The Darkside: Volume 1". MTV News reported that Fat Joe intended "all the material...to be much harsher" than his previous album. On March 28, 2010, Fat Joe signed a record deal with E1 Music and announced that he would release The Darkside Vol. 1 through the label in July. Fat Joe stated The Darkside Vol. 1 is all about: showin' the world that I'm a legend, and just furtherin' the legacy." Fat Joe stated that he returned to his hardcore hip hop roots and considers this album to be a classic.

Singles
The first single from The Darkside is "(Ha Ha) Slow Down", which features rapper Young Jeezy. The song peaked at number 54 on US Hot R&B/Hip-Hop Songs and number 23 on their Hot Rap Songs chart. The second single is "If It Ain't About Money" featuring Trey Songz. The song charted on US Hot R&B/Hip-Hop Songs, peaking at number 57, and also charted at 25 on the US Hot Rap Songs chart.

Critical reception

The Darkside Vol. 1 received positive reviews from music critics. On Metacritic, the album has a score of 70 out of 100, based on 6 critics, indicating "generally favorable reviews". Allmusic gave it 3½ out of 5 stars, stating "instead of sounding uninspired on topics he's visited, revisited, and then some, he sounds on fire, as if this were his grand debut." HipHopDX gave the album 4 out of 5 stars, praising its "Hardcore lyricism backed by the conviction that has been lacking since the '90s," also calling it his "best-produced album in over a decade." RapReviews gave it a 7/10 rating, writing "Reputation now restored, Joe finds himself comfortably back in the role of narrator to the streets." ThaCorner gave it 3½ out of 5 stars, noting "at the end of the thirteen track album you'll find that Joe impresses more with his skill to put together a hot album than his actual skills as a rapper."

Commercial performance 
The Darkside Vol. 1 debuted at number 27 on the US Billboard 200 chart, selling 12,300 copies in the first week. The album also debuted number nine on the US Top R&B/Hip-Hop Albums and number seven on US Top Rap Albums charts respectively. The album made it to number two on the US Top Independent Albums chart.

Track listing 
This complete track list was published by Amazon.

Sample credits
"Intro" – Contains a sample of "Just a Memory" by The Notorious B.I.G. featuring Clipse
"Valley of Death" – Contains a sample of "Do I Stand a Chance" by The Montclairs
"Kilo" – Contains a sample of "I Weigh With Kilos" by Jimmy Van & Richard Hieronymus
"Rappers Are in Danger" – Contains a sample of "Time's Up" by O.C.
"(Ha Ha) Slow Down" – Contains a sample of "Back to Life (A cappella)" by Soul II Soul
"No Problems" – Contains samples of "Flash's Theme" by Queen and "Terminator X to the Edge of Panic" by Public Enemy
"Heavenly Father" – Contains a sample of "Pray to the Lord" by Lil Wayne

Charts

References

External links

2010 albums
E1 Music albums
Fat Joe albums
Terror Squad (group) albums
Albums produced by Cool & Dre
Albums produced by DJ Premier
Albums produced by Just Blaze
Albums produced by Scoop DeVille
Albums produced by Scram Jones